The Holy Name Church is a parish of the Roman Catholic Church located in the Jesmond suburb in Newcastle upon Tyne.

History

On 1 December 1901, the parish was founded. The place of worship was established in a leased house at 68 Manor House Road. On  18 January 1903, a temporary iron church was opened on St George's Terrace. It served as the main chapel for almost 27 years. In 1922, a parish hall called "Osborne Hall" was built. Osborne Hall is now part of the Jesmond swimming baths. A new church was planned and construction began on 24 June 1928.

The church

By 1929, Holy Name Church, with a capacity for 400 people, was built. It is located at the junction of Mitchell Avenue and North Jesmond Avenue. It has several stained windows in different artistic styles. Behind the sanctuary, there are four panels containing large pictures of saints. The saints in the panels are, from left to right, St Thomas Beckett, St Thomas More, St Margaret Clitheroe, St Gabriel, St Michael, St Margaret of Scotland, St John Fisher, and St Cuthbert holding the head of St Oswald.

List of parish priests

 1901-1904 Fr Joseph Newsham
 1904-1950 Fr Aloysius Johnson
 1950-1971 Fr Michael Henry
 1971-1972 Fr Gerard Crumbley
 1972-1978 Bp Owen Swindlehurst
 1978-1992 Fr John White
 1992-1994 Fr Benedict Carey
 1994-2005 Fr Adrian Dixon
 2005-2013 Fr Michael Whalen
 2013–present Fr Michael Campion

Geography

The Holy Name parish belongs to the deanery of St Andrew and St Anthony, in the Episcopal area of Newcastle and North Tyneside, and is part of the Diocese of Hexham and Newcastle.

To the north of the parish is St Charles's parish (South Gosforth), to the south is St Dominic's parish (Byker), to the east is Jesmond Dene, and on the west with the Town Moor. Originally, Holy Name parish included the district of Benton to the east which is now St Aidan's parish. Currently, the Holy Name serves about 200 active parishioners who attend religious services mainly during the weekends.

See also
 St Mary's Cathedral
 Sacred Heart Church, North Gosforth
 Jesmond Parish Church

References

External links
 
 The Church of the Holy Name site

Roman Catholic churches in Tyne and Wear
Churches in Newcastle upon Tyne
Romanesque Revival church buildings in England
1901 establishments in England
Roman Catholic churches completed in 1929
20th-century Roman Catholic church buildings in the United Kingdom